This is the list of justices of Rajasthan High Court since its inception on 29 August 1949.

  Naval Kishore from 29.08.1949 to 03.11.1951
  K. L. Bapna from 29.08.1949 to 04.01.1960	
  Jawan Singh Ranawat from 29.08.1949 to 10.10.1961
  Kshem Chandra Gupta from 29.08.1949 to N.A.
  Trilochan Dutta from 29.08.1949 to N.A.
  K. Amar Singh from 29.08.1949 to 30.06.1950
  Sardool Singh Mehta from 29.08.1949	to N.A.
  Mohammad Ibrahim from 29.08.1949 to 18.07.1950
  Durga Shanker Dave from 29.08.1949 to 12.07.1952   25.01.1951 to 31.05.1963
  Kumar Krishna Sharma from 29.08.1949 to 25.01.1951   15.06.1951 to 12.03.1959
  Anand Narain Kaul	from 29.08.1949 to 31.03.1950	
  Indernath Modi from 29.01.1953 to 28.02.1967
  Daulat Mal Bhandari from 26.07.1955 to 17.12.1968
  Jagat Narain from	20.01.1958 to 15.12.1969
  L. N. Chhangani from 01.09.1959 to 12.10.1972
  C. B. Bhargava from 01.02.1960 to 12.11.1971
  Bhagwati Prasad Beri from	16.08.1960 to 13.02.1973
  Prakash Narain Singhal from 21.06.1961 to 16.02.1975
  Vedpal Tyagi from	13.09.1962 to 05.11.1975
  Kan Singh Parihar from 08.08.1964 to 29.08.1975
  Lehar Singh Mehta from 01.03.1967 to 11.08.1973
  Chand Mal Lodha from 22.11.1967 to 27.06.1976
  Gopal Mal Mehta from 23.11.1967 to 03.09.1968
  S. N. Modi	from 01.03.1969 to 06.11.1977
  R. D. Gattani from	26.02.1970 to 31.01.1974
  Jagdish Prasad Jain from	12.08.1970 to 17.09.1975
  Mohan Lal Joshi from 22.11.1971 to 30.06.1979
  K. D. Sharma from 20.07.1973 to 06.01.1981	
  Dwarka Prasad Gupta from	24.09.1973 to 11.04.1986	
  M. L. Shrimal from 07.10.1974 to 17.12.1983
  Mangilal Jain from 01.07.1975 to 23.07.1978
  Purushottam Das Kudal from 01.07.1975 to 19.10.1982
  Rajinder Sachar from 10.05.1976 to 08.07.1977
  A. P. Sen from 20.06.1976 to 27.02.1978
  Ramji Lal Gupta from 02.09.1976 to 09.08.1978
  Ananda Prakash Sen from 16.02.1977 to 12.05.1977
  Guman Mal Lodha from 01.05.1978 to 28.02.1988	
  Shrikrishnamal Lodha from	01.05.1978 to 27.06.1986
  Narendra Mohan Kasliwal from 15.06.1978 to 28.03.1989
  Milap Chand Jain from 15.06.1978 to 14.04.1990
  Suresh Chandra Agarwal from 15.06.1978 to 10.01.1990
  Kashmir Singh Sidhu from	20.07.1978 to 08.03.1985
 Kumari Kanta Bhatnagar from 26.09.1978 to 14.06.1992
  Mahendra Bhushan Sharma from 25.11.1978 to 24.06.1982
  Suraj Narain Didwania from 25.11.1978 to 24.06.1981
  Surendra Nath Bhargava from 20.10.1982 to 19.01.1993
  Dinkar Lal Mehta from 29.10.1982 to 04.01.1992
  Kishore Singh Lodha from	04.04.1983 to 29.06.1990
  Gopal Krishna Sharma from	04.04.1983 to 06.02.1990
  Shyam Sunder Byas from 09.05.1983 to 30.04.1990
  Vinod Shanker Dave from 12.06.1984 to 15.02.1994	
  Mahendra Bhushan Sharma from 13.07.1985 to 29.09.1993
  Jasraj Chopra from 13.07.1985 to 19.08.1995
  Pana Chand Jain from 13.07.1985 to 18.03.1989
  Shobhag Mal Jain from 13.07.1985 to 07.10.1990
  Inder Sen Israni from 13.07.1985 to 15.04.1993
  Farooq Hasan from 13.07.1985 to 31.12.1994
  Mohini Kapoor from 13.07.1985 to 17.11.1995
  Ashok Kumar Mathur from 13.07.1985 to 17.02.1994   | Transferred  to Madhya Pradesh High Court
  Naveen Chandra Sharma from 27.10.1986 to 09.09.1992
  Milap Chandra Jain from 30.06.1987 to 18.12.1994
  Ranveer Sahai Verma from 26.12.1987 to 07.01.1995
  N. C. Kochhar from 17.06.1988 to 25.03.1997
  Ram Saharan Kejriwal from 20.07.1990 to 03.07.1997
  Balwant Roy Arora	from 20.07.1990 to 14.08.1997
  Navrang Lal Tibrewal from 20.07.1990 to 16.01.1999
  Nagendra Kumar Jain from 20.07.1990 to 18.12.1997   | Transferred  to Madras High Court & Chief Justice of Madras High Court on 13.09.2000 & again | Transferred  to Karnataka High Court on 11.05.1994
  Magraj Khalla from 20.07.1990 to 27.04.1994   10.09.2001 to 12.03.2003
  Ganpat Singh Singhvi from 20.07.1990 to 27.04.1994	| Transferred  to Punjab and Haryana High Court
  Y. R. Meena from 20.07.1990 to 21.12.1997   01.11.2001 to N.A.   | Transferred  to Calcutta High Court & again to Rajasthan High Court
  Virendra Kumar Singhal from 21.10.1991 to 14.12.1997
  Rajesh Balia from 21.10.1991 to 13.12.1999   23.06.1994 to N.A.   Appointed as Chief Justice of Patna High Court 05.01.2008
  Rajendra Prasad Saxena from 21.10.1991 to 31.05.1998
  V. K. Bali from 28.02.2005 to 21.01.2006	| Transferred from Punjab and Haryana High Court
  Anshuman Singh from 28.04.1994 to 06.07.1997	| Transferred  from Allahabad High Court
  Maheshwari Prasad Singh from 28.04.1994 to 09.04.1998	| Transferred from Allahabad High Court and Again to Allahabad High Court
  Vishnu Sadashiv Kokje from 28.04.1994 to 06.09.2001	| Transferred from Madhya Pradesh High Court
  B. J. Shethna from 28.10.1994 to 03.06.2001
  P. P. Naolekar from 28.04.1994 to 09.06.2002	| Transferred from Madhya Pradesh High Court
  Arun Madan from 24.02.1994 to 21.03.2003	| Transferred from Delhi High Court
  V. G. Palshikar from 14.02.1994 to 31.05.2001	| Transferred from Bombay High Court
  Shiv Kishore Keshote from 31.01.1994 to 16.02.1994   28.05.2001 to 01.01.2006
  N. N. Mathur from 31.01.1994 to 14.02.1994   25.02.1999 to N.A.   Retired on 20.02.2007
  Rajendra Mal Lodha from 31.01.1994 to 15.02.1994	| Transferred to Bombay High Court & appointed as Chief Justice of Patna High Court on 13.05.2008
  Om Prakash Jain from 31.01.1994 to 16.02.1994	| Transferred to Allahabad High Court on 17.02.1994
  R. R. Yadav from 15.02.1994 to 31.05.2001	| Transferred from Allahabad High Court & Transferred back to Allahabad High Court 01.06.2001
  Prem Krishan Palli from 01.03.1994 to 26.03.1996	| Transferred  from Punjab and Haryana High Court & | Transferred to Himachal Pradesh High Court
  Gyan Sudha Misra from 21.04.1994    | Transferred  from Patna High Court appointed as Chief Justice of Jharkhand High Court on 13.07.2008
  A. P. Ravani from 25.02.1995 to 03.04.1995
  Prem Chand Jain from 22.07.1995 to 11.09.1998
  Dinesh Chandra Dalela from 22.07.1995 to 20.05.1999
  P. K. Tewari from 22.07.1995 to 17.07.2000	
  G. L. Gupta from 22.07.1995 to 09.11.2000
  M. A. A. Khan from 22.07.1995 to 06.01.2000
  M. G. Mukherjee from 23.02.1996 to 18.09.1996	| Transferred from Calcutta High Court
  Jogindra Singh Siddhu from 11.10.1996 to 29.01.1999	| Transferred from Punjab and Haryana High Court then to Allahabad High Court and the Rajasthan High Court
  Shiv Kumar Sharma	from 06.04.1996 to 10.10.2008
  Bhagwati Prasad from 06.04.1996	-	| Transferred  to Gujarat High Court on 07.02.2008
  A. K. Parihar from 06.04.1996 to 24.08.2009
  S. C. Mittal from 06.04.1996 to 12.08.2000	
  Amar Singh Godara from 06.04.1996 to 01.05.1999
  Mohd. Yamin from 06.04.1996 to 	03.07.2001
  A. K. Singh from 06.04.1996	 to 14.08.2000
  Nand Kumar Agarwal from 06.04.1996 to 	28.04.1996	| Transferred  to Punjab and Haryana High Court
  Jagdish Chandra Verma from 14.05.1996 to 	15.12.2001
  B. S. Chouhan from 17.07.1997 to 13.03.2003	| Transferred  from Allahabad High Court
  A. M. Kapadia from 11.12.1997 to 04.03.2011	| Transferred  from Gujarat High Court
  P. B. Majumdar from 17.09.1999 to 09.09.2012	| Transferred  from Gujarat High Court & again | Transferred  to Bombay High Court 28.05.08
  Abhay Manohar Sapre from 25.10.1999 to 28.08.2016	| Transferred  from Madhya Pradesh & Transferred  to Chhattisgarh High Court 23.04.12
  Arun Kumar Mishra from 25.10.1999 to 03.09.2017	| Transferred  from Madhya Pradesh High Court & again to Calcutta High Court 14.12.12
  N. P. Gupta from 20.01.2000 to 20.01.2010
  D. N. Joshi from 20.01.2000 to 11.10.2003
  S. K. Garg	from 29.03.2000	 to 20.02.2005 until Resigned
  K. S. Rathore from 30.10.2000 to 14.04.2010
  Rattan Chand Gandhi from 17.01.2001 to 21.01.2010	| Transferred  from Jammu and Kashmir High Court
  Prakash Chandra Tatia from 11.01.2001 to 04.08.2013
  H. R. Panwar from 11.01.2001 to 10.02.2010
  Khem Chand Sharma from 11.01.2001  to 	07.08.2010
  Shashikant Sharma	from 11.01.2001 to 	16.06.2006
  Jagat Singh from 01.03.2001 to 28.02.2003
  O. P. Bishnoi from 29.08.2001 to 10.07.2004
  Anoop Chand Goyal	from 29.08.2001	 to 25.02.2005
  Harbans Lal from 29.08.2001 to 12.03.2007
  K. K. Acharya from 05.03.2002 to 08.08.2008
  F. C. Bansal from 05.03.2002 to 01.01.2006
  Dalip Singh from 02.09.2004 to 18.11.2012
  Narendra Kumar Jain from 02.09.2004 to 08.10.2014
  Rajendra Prasad Vyas from 02.09.2004	-	Died on 27.10.2006
  Dinesh Maheshwari	from 02.09.2004 to 18.07.2014	| Transferred  to Allahabad High Court
  Jitendra Rai Goyal from 02.02.2005 to 04.04.2010
  Manak Lal Mohta from 02.02.2005 to 01.07.2009
  Suresh Chandra Singhal from 02.02.2005 to 08.03.2005	Died
  Satyaprakash Pathak from 02.02.2005 to 15.12.2010
  Prem Shanker Asopa from 13.06.2005 to 30.09.2013	
  Chatra Ram Jat from 20.01.2006 to 01.09.2008
  Gauri Shanker Sarraf from 20.01.2006 to 01.07.2010
  Guman Singh to 06.02.2010
  Bhanwaroo Khan to	10.07.2009
  Deo Narayan Thanvi to	03.06.2010
  Justice Kishan Swaroop Chaudhari from 15.04.2008 to 30.06.2010
  C. M. Totla from 15.04.2008 to 28.04.2012	
  M. C. Bhagwati from 15.04.2008 to 10.06.2012
  Meena V. Gomber from	29.09.2009 to 30.07.2013	
  Kailash Chandra Joshi from 24.05.2010 to 15.05.2012
  Sajjan Singh Kothari from 24.05.2010 to 10.10.2012
  Narendra Kumar Jain from 28.04.2011 to 15.04.2014
  Raghvendra S. Chauhan from 13.06.2005 to 09.03.2015	| Transferred  to Karnataka High Court
  Vishnu Kumar Mathur from 21.01.2013 to 01.04.2015
  Raghuvendra Singh Rathore from 05.07.2007 to 30.06.2015
  Atul Kumar Jain from 16.01.2013 to 27.08.2015
  Nisha Gupta from 28.04.2011 to 12.09.2015

See also
 List of chief justices of the Rajasthan High Court

References

 
Lists of Indian judges